John Black (born in Aberdeen, Scotland) is a British music manager.

Background
Having worked in the oil industry in Aberdeen for 10 years where he owned a graphic design company, in 1999 John Black decided to change career to work in music and relocated to London to start building websites and provide online PR for artists such as 5ive, Destiny's Child, The Beautiful South, D-Side and All Saints. At this time many artists didn't have websites, and John was key in creating groundbreaking sites and fan communities for the artists he worked with.

John moved over to artist management where one of his first acts was the Irish boyband D-Side, who had three top ten singles in the UK then under Black's management released 3 albums and a greatest hits in Japan on the Avex label where they had great success.

From 2005 John co-managed Scottish singer Sandi Thom who in 2006 had a number 1 single and album in the UK following a series of webcast shows from her basement in Tooting, London, Black was key in the success of Sandi Thom. From 2007 John managed Stevie Appleton who signed to RCA Records. Appleton featured in a Smart Car TV campaign in several countries including Japan where he went on to have success under Black's guidance and had one of the biggest radio hits in Japan in 2009. In 2017 Stevie signed to Warner Bros and released his first new single there in April 2018, in 2019 Stevie released a collaboration with the world renowned Dutch DJ/producer Tiësto.

In December 2010 John joined Craig Logan in his new venture, Logan Media Entertainment managing Cher Lloyd, Russell Watson and Anastacia looking after both domestic and international activity.  In March 2013 John consulted for The CAN Group to set up the music division and signed Oritsé Williams from the British boyband JLS.  In 2014 John was instrumental in creating a new sound and image for UK artist Peter Andre.  John was A&R on Peter's Big Night album and was the creative behind his Big Night tour. The first single from the album featured in the DreamWorks Animation movie Mr. Peabody & Sherman. John also worked on Christmas album with Andre, the lead track of which was an original song which featured on the Iceland (supermarket) Christmas TV campaign in 2014.

In January 2015 John re-launched Black Gold Music Management, a joint venture between himself and Cooking Vinyl.  Clients past and present include A*M*E, Stevie Appleton, Union J singer George Shelley also known for presenting the Capital London breakfast show and Maxi Jazz from Faithless.

In 2021, John launched the first of many virtual AI driven acts, Skullz under his new label venture Soundr along with Pete Kirtley. The acts will exist exclusively in virtual worlds.

References

1967 births
Living people
Musicians from Aberdeen